Cochliasanthus  caracalla is a leguminous flowering plant in the family Fabaceae that originates in tropical South America and Central America. The species is named caracalla, a corruption of the Portuguese caracol, meaning snail.  

This perennial vine (when grown in a climate without frost) has fragrant flowers said to be reminiscent of hyacinths - with a distinctive curled shape, giving rise to the common names corkscrew vine, snail vine, snail creeper, snailflower or snail bean. It is the only member of the genus Cochliasanthus and was formerly considered to belong to the genus Vigna. 

Two very different plant species are sold and cultivated under this one name. One plant is the true Cochliasanthus caracalla. The other, also called "Phaseolus giganteus" (a horticultural name, not validly published), appears to be Vigna speciosa or a close relative. Thomas Jefferson called this plant "the most beautiful bean in the world".

Description
The purple, non-fragrant, invasive flowers of the "Phaseolus giganteus" are said to have snail or snail-shell shaped flowers, hence the origin of the common name. The multicolored, fragrant, non-invasive flowers of the Cochliasanthus caracalla are said to have corkscrew or nautilus-shell shaped flowers, hence the origin of that common name. Though some claim that the leaves of one species are darker and differently sized compared to the leaves of the other, it is difficult to distinguish between these two plants through foliage alone. 

There have been multiple instances where both plants have been grown side by side for years and the discovery that they were not the same species was made only after the less mature plant finally bloomed. It is said that both plants are pollinated by ants so, without ants, the plant will produce few, if any, seeds, although C. caracalla is pollinated by bees in Argentine, which is its native range.

Corkscrew vine

The corkscrew vine, Cochliasanthus caracalla, has highly fragrant, multicolored, corkscrew or spiral shaped flowers and is not an invasive plant.  More specifically, the flowers are white with purple streaks that fade to cream and then to yellow with age. They hang in twelve-inch long clusters. The flowers are extremely wavy and immature blossoms very much resemble multicolored spirals or corkscrews. This plant grows white buds that produce nectar, which attracts ants, who then pollinate the flowers. The fragrance has been likened to Chinese wisteria, Jasmine, and Magnolia. It is claimed that the plant can be smelled from 15 feet away. The Corkscrew Vine is less frost tolerant than the Snail Vine.

Snail vine

The snail vine, Phaseolus giganteus, is delightfully fragrant.  According to Baker Creek Rare Seeds, "This vining member of the bean family is one of the most intriguing plants that we’ve ever grown! The uniquely shaped flowers actually resemble small snails! The fragrance of these distinct blooms is thought to be reminiscent of hyacinths, and Thomas Jefferson called this plant 'The most beautiful bean in the world.' Perennial in its native region of Central and South America, snail vine is typically grown as an annual in areas that experience frost. We enjoyed an abundance of fragrant flowers all summer long, and are so excited to offer this incredible and wonderful vining plant! Rare and hard to find." 

Flowers are a solid, pale purple. The flowers, which grow alone or in small groups rather than in clusters, consist of four petals: one large wavy half-circle on the top, two tear-drop shaped petals that point inwards, and a thin, erect, curly petal sprouting from the center of the flower. Depending on the angle, the two bottom petals can appear to be a single petal that strongly resembles the large, upper petal. When this happens, the three main petals come together to form an open-clam shape. The center of the flower and the end of the thin, erect may have a small area of yellow and/or white but the color is usually faint and only noticeable upon close examination.

Immature flower buds often form fat half-crescents but, unlike the corkscrew vine, these buds are green, yellow, or brown. This plant might be more susceptible to aphids but is definitely invasive and has been compared by multiple growers to kudzu. Rapid growth combined with the ability of vines touching the ground to take root make this an invasive plant. This plant has been known to regrow even after all foliage visible above ground has died from frost.

Cultivation
This vine is hardy in zones 9 and above, liking full sun and consistently damp soil. It prefers high heat and humidity.  In colder zones, it does well in a pot if it is overwintered inside.

Harvest
Flowers typically bloom in late summer or autumn and, if pollination by bees is successful, seeds come soon after. Seeds grow inside pods, like pea pods. If the grower wants to cultivate them, pods should be removed from the plant while still green to prevent exposure to winter temperatures. The seeds, which are technically beans, could be edible. Parts of the true Corkscrew plant might be poisonous.

Preparation
There is disagreement among growers on whether nicking the seed coat is more harmful or helpful to germination and some support nicking, while others recommend against it. One widespread practice that does yield a high degree of success is to pour boiling water on the seeds and let the seeds soak overnight in that water as it naturally cools to room temperature.

Sowing
Burpee recommends that the seeds be sown in "ordinary soil in a sunny area in spring after danger of frost" has passed. The seeds should be planted two to three inches apart and covered with half an inch of "fine soil". Burpee then recommends growers to "firm lightly" the soil and "keep evenly moist".

The seedlings will sprout in one to three weeks depending on the weather. If grown indoors or inside a greenhouse, then the seedlings can be moved outdoors when "spring temperatures remain above 50 F." These plants will thrive in full sun to partial shade and can attain a height of twenty feet.

Flowers can blossom during the same growing season that the seeds were planted in. The plant blooms for as much as eight weeks.

It is possible to grow both vine species from cuttings.

References

External links
 Differences between the two types
 The Snail Vine - Confusion Reigns Supreme 

Phaseoleae
Flora of Central America
Monotypic Fabaceae genera